The Harrogate International Youth Festival (HIYF) is one of the countries longest running Youth Festivals of music and performing arts and provides opportunities for young people from across the globe to come together and perform in a number of prestigious venues in and around the Harrogate area. The festival is traditionally held over the Easter weekend, culminating in a massed band and massed choir performance at the closing concerts.

History
The festival was founded in 1973 as a venture between Harrogate Borough Council and the local chapter of World Friends International. The festival was founded with the support of the local borough of Harrogate and a number of local groups and schools who for many years provided homestay opportunities for visiting groups. In the early 1970s, Harrogate was promoting itself as a hub in the North of England for conferences and events, and the festival continues to flourish to this day. The festival is now considered to be one of the most important Youth Festivals of music and performing arts in the country and attracts students from around the world. The festival is operated by the Kent-based travel company ECE, and run on the ground in Harrogate by a local committee over the Easter weekend.

Visiting countries and groups
Groups come from around the world to the festival and are supported by local schools and groups who also perform at the concerts. Throughout the history of the festival, groups have come from North America and Canada, Scandinavia, Europe, Russia and in recent years from Africa. Local schools and groups including St John Fisher Catholic High School, Harrogate, St Aidan's Church of England High School, and Harrogate High School (who have performed at every event since 1973) also perform as part of the weekend. Other local groups include the Katrina Hughes School of Dance, The St. Aelreds Dancers and the local branch of the Sea Cadets.

Performance venues and concerts
The Royal Hall, Harrogate is used for the opening and closing concerts at the festival and features a massed performance, usually totalling a few hundred musicians. Ripon Cathedral is used for the choral and orchestral evening. The Parade takes place on Easter Saturday and features marching bands and other groups in a parade that passes through the town centre.

References

links 
Harrogate International Youth Festival (HIYF)
Harrogate International Youth Festival

Events in Harrogate
Music festivals in Yorkshire